Vanessa Briscoe Hay (born October 18, 1955) is an American singer for the Athens, Georgia bands Pylon, Supercluster and Pylon Reenactment Society.

Biography
Born to a textile worker and a housewife in Atlanta, Georgia, Hay attended elementary and high school in Dacula, Georgia, prior to moving to Athens to attend college. Hay graduated from the University of Georgia art school in 1978. She became the singer for Pylon after being auditioned by Michael Lachowski, Randy Bewley, and Curtis Crowe. A few months later Pylon were the opening band for the British group the Gang of Four in New York City, at the club Hurrah, after being brought to the club's attention by Kate Pierson and Fred Schneider of the B-52's.

Danny Beard, from Atlanta helped Pylon to record their first single "Cool/Dub" in 1979 at Stone Mountain Studios in Atlanta, and Pylon began to tour the US. The album Gyrate followed and was released in late 1980. Early career highlights included a performance at Central Park opening for the B-52's, a tour of the UK, opening a few dates for U2 on their first major US tour and the release of the album Chomp.

Pylon decided to quit while they were still having fun. They broke up for the first time in 1983 after playing a "final" show, which was taped for The Athens Show. This was never formally released. In 1986, Hay was filmed for the movie Athens, GA: Inside Out and spoke about her experiences with Pylon. She and Bob Hay were married in 1986. In 1987 they had their first daughter.

In 1989, Pylon reformed. Career highlights the second time around included tours with both R.E.M. and the B-52's, performances at SXSW and CMJ. Hits, a compilation of their early material was reissued by DB Records in 1989.  Pylon recorded their third album Chain for the Atlanta label Sky Records in 1991. Pylon broke up a second time in 1992.They played several more shows including the South by Southwest Festival in 1990 and 1991, but when guitarist Bewley decided to leave in 1991, the band broke up again.

Vanessa Hay became an RN in 1994. In 1993, she and Bob Hay had their second daughter.

Randy Bewley approached the other band members about reforming Pylon, just for fun, in 2004. In August, 2004 Pylon played an unannounced show at Little Kings in Athens, Georgia. In 2005, they played a series of dates in Athens and Atlanta, including Athfest and at the Atlanta Heroes awards by the invitation of the B-52's. Jason Gross, Perfect Sound Forever encouraged them to look into reissuing their first album, Gyrate, on CD. Jeff Calder (The Swimming Pool Q's) restored the tapes at Southern Tracks Studios in Atlanta and Rodney Mills remastered them at Rodney Mills Masterhouse in Duluth, Georgia. DFA records in New York approached Pylon about reissuing this material, unaware that Pylon were already working toward this. James Murphy of LCD Soundsystem (band), had been including Pylon's song "Danger" in his DJ sets for several years and was interested in re—issuing Pylon's first album Gyrate on his label DFA. Gyrate Plus was reissued on October 16, 2007.  A remastered Chomp More was reissued on October 20, 2009.

Hay was also a member of the recording project Supercluster (band) who recorded and sometimes performed in Athens, Georgia along with Jason NeSmith. Other members of this project included Hannah M. Jones, Kay Stanton, Bob Hay, Bill David, John Fernandes, Heather McIntosh, Bryan Poole and Randy Bewley (deceased). Waves, their full-length project, was released on October 6, 2009.

A 7-inch vinyl single "Gravity / Altitude" by Pylon was issued in April 2016 by Chunklet as a part of the Pylon Live project. A double vinyl album was issued on July 25, 2016. This music was recorded at the first final performance on December 1, 1983 at the Mad Hatter in Athens, GA. Vanessa performed with Pylon Reenactment Society at both release events along with Swimming Pool Q's and members of Love Tractor.

Since 2014, Hay has fronted the Pylon Reenactment Society, a Pylon tribute act who have featured members from more recent Athens bands like the Glands and Casper & the Cookies. In a 2016 Portland Mercury interview, Hays said, "It's been inspirational, if that's the right word, to be able to play this music again. I really don't want people to forget Pylon. These are different people and we are re-enacting this experience, so it's not exactly Pylon, but it's fresh and done in the same spirit". In October 2017, Pylon Reenactment Society self-released an EP initially recorded on December 11, 2016, for broadcast in Los Angeles, California, for DJ Michael Stock's KXLU show "Part Time Punks," called "Part Time Punks Session." In March 2018, Hay was named one of the “25 Best Frontwomen of All Time” by Paste Magazine

Discography

Pylon
 Cool/Dub  7-inch single (Caution Records 1980)
 Gyrate LP (DB Records, Armageddon 1980)
 Pylon !! EP (DB Records, Armageddon 1980)
 Crazy/M-Train  7-inch single (DB Records 1982)
 Beep/Altitude  7-inch single (DB Records 1982)
 Four Minutes/Beep/Altitude EP (DB Records 1982)
 Chomp LP (DB Records 1983)
 Hits LP/CD (DB Records 1988)
 Chain LP/CD (Sky Records 1990)
 Gyrate Plus CD (DFA Records, 2007)
 Chomp More CD (DFA Records, October 20, 2009)
 Gravity/Weather Radio  7-inch single (Chunklet, 2016)
 Pylon Live Double LP  (Chunklet, 2016)
 Pylon Box Boxset  (New West Records, 2020)

Supercluster
 Special 5 EP (self-issued, 2008)
 Waves CD (Cloud Recordings/Studio Mouse Productions) (October 6, 2009)
 I Got The Answer/Sunflower Clock 7-inch single (Cloud Recordings/Studio Mouse Productions) (October 6, 2009)
 Paris Effect/Neat in the Street 7-inch single (Cloud Recordings/Studio Mouse Productions) (March 29, 2011) 
 Things We Used To Drink/Memory Of The Future 7-inch single (Studio Mouse Productions) (July 10, 2012)

Pylon Reenactment Society
 Part Time Punks Session Vinyl 6 song 12-inch EP  (PRS, Chunklet Industries, October 20, 2017) PRS001
 Messenger / Cliff Notes  Vinyl 2 song 7” single  (PRS,Chunklet Industries, November 30, 2019) PRS002

Compilations

With Pylon
 Declaration of Independents - 13 Tracks of U.S. Rock 1980, Vinyl LP, Various artists (1980, Ambition Records AMB1, Basement Records BASE 6005, Stiff Records Yank 2)
 Jericho Go, Vinyl LP, Various artists (1985, DB Recs / Stiff Records D BAT80) (DB Recs / Victor Musical Industries, Inc.  VIL 28034)
 Athens, GA - Inside / Out, Vinyl LP, Various artists (1987, I.R.S. Records IRS6185)
 Hits, Cassette, CD (1989, DB Recs DB91)
 Squares Blot Out the Sun, Vinyl LP, CD, Cassette, Various artists (1990, DB Recs DB72)
 Totally Wired, CD, Various artists  (1995, Razor & Tie RE 2076)Various - Totally Wired Discogs
 KFJC 98.7 Fifty - Blowing Minds Since 1959, Vinyl double record LP, Various artists (2009, No label KJFC24)
 Keith Haring - The World of Keith Haring - Influences + Connections , Vinyl triple record LP boxset, Triple CD boxset, Various artists (2019, Soul Jazz, Ltd. SJR LP444)

With other artists
 Finest Worksongs:Athens Bands play the music of R.E.M. CD (2007, Iron Horse IHR002)  (guest vocalist-The Observatory-"Pilgrimage")

Other
 Dead Letter Office (LP) LP (IRS Records 1985) (Cover of "Crazy" by R.E.M.)
 We Made A Record, What Did You Do?/Wuxtry Record Store Day Compilation (LP) LP (Wuxtry Records 2010) (Paris Effect)
 Cover + Remix 7-inch single (DFA Records, October 2011) (Cover of "Cool" by Deerhunter, Remix of Yo-Yo by Calvinist)
 Tunabunny - "Form A Line RSD" 12-inch 12-inch ep (HHBTM Records, April 2013) ("Form A Line" by Tunabunny, Form A Line: Vanessa Vocal Version,Back It Up Dub Version, Album Version, Line Dance Version)
 Dressy Bessy - "Lady Liberty" album  (Yep Rock Records, February 2016) (Backing vocals on "Get Along (Diamond Ring) by Dressy Bessy

Filmography
 Athens, GA.: Inside/Out (1987), archive footage, interview
 Motherhood(2009), songtrack song "Stop It," Pylon mentioned as The Pylons by Eliza Uma Thurmond, the main character who also dances with a bicycle messenger to this song.

Video 
 Beep (1990), Pylon, from CD: Hits, a compilation, DB Records
 Look Alive (1992), Pylon, from album :Chain, Sky Records
 Too Many Eights (2007), Supercluster, from CDR EP: Special 5
 I Got the Answer (2009), Supercluster, from: CD Waves, Studio Mouse Productions/Cloud Recordings
 Neat In The Street (2011), Supercluster, from: single "Paris Effect"/"Neat In The Street", Studio Mouse Productions/Cloud Recordings. Written by The Side Effects (Butchart/Ellison/Swartz), 1980.
 Memory Of The Future (2012), Supercluster, from: single Things We Used To Drink/Memory Of The Future, Studio Mouse Productions. Directed by Hana Hay and Hannah Jones from artwork by Hannah Jones.
 Beep (2017), Pylon Reenactment Society, from Vinyl 12” Ep Part Time Punks Sessiom, PRS for Chunklet Industries, from unreleased documentary “Athens, GA...30 Years On” directed by Bill Cody,edited by Tony Brazier.
 Messenger (2019), Pylon Reenactment Society, from Vinyl 7” Single Messenger / Cliff Notes, PRS for Chunklet Industries, directed by Tony Brazier.

References

Sources
Reynolds, Simon: Rip It Up and Start Again: Postpunk 1978-1984, Penguin Books, February 2006, p. 264.
Strong,Martin Charles: The Great Indie Discography, Canongate Books, October 2003, p. 282.
Christgau,Robert: Christgau's Consumer Guide-the 80's, Pantheon Books, 1990, pp. 329, 498, 506.
Hale,Grace Elizabeth: “Cool Town How Athens, Georgia, Launched Alternative Music and Changed American Culture”,A Ferris and Ferris Book , February 13, 2020

External links
 official site
 Pylon unofficial web site
 [ AllMusic entry on Pylon]
 [ AllMusic entry on Supercluster]

American rock singers
American women singers
1955 births
Living people
University of Georgia alumni
Musicians from Athens, Georgia
American new wave musicians
People from Dacula, Georgia
21st-century American women
Pylon (band) members